David Edmund Young (born May 11, 1968) is an American politician who currently serves as a member of the Iowa House of Representatives from the 28th District, and previously served as the U.S. representative for Iowa's 3rd congressional district from 2015 to 2019. A member of the Republican Party, he is a native and resident of Van Meter, a western suburb of Des Moines. He was first elected in 2014 and reelected in 2016; he lost reelection in 2018 to Democrat Cindy Axne. Young unsuccessfully challenged Axne in 2020 in a rematch, losing by 1.3%.

Young was elected to the Iowa House of Representatives in 2022. He represents parts of Dallas County, including western suburbs of Des Moines.

Early life and education
Young was born in Van Meter, Iowa. He earned a Bachelor of Arts degree in English from Drake University.

Early career 
From 2006 to 2013, he served as the chief of staff to Iowa Republican senator Chuck Grassley. He was previously chief of staff to Kentucky senator Jim Bunning from 1998 to 2006.

U.S. House of Representatives

Elections

2014 

The Republican nomination was decided by a convention after none of the six candidates reached the 35 percent threshold required to make the general election ballot. This was the second time in 50 years that a convention picked a nominee and the first time since 2002. A poll conducted by the conservative website Caffeinated Thoughts of 118 of the 513 delegates was conducted on June 9–10, 2014. Young and Brad Zaun took 27% each.

On June 21, 2014, in what was described by the Des Moines Register as a "stunning upset", Young won the nomination on the fifth ballot of the convention. Young went on to defeat Democrat Staci Appel 53% to 42% in the 2014 general election.

2016 

Young ran for re-election in 2016. He defeated Joe Grandanette in the Republican primary, which took place on June 7, 2016. He then defeated Democrat Jim Mowrer in the general election, winning 54% of the vote.

2018 

Young ran for reelection in 2018. He was unopposed in the Republican Party primary. In the November 2018 general election, he was defeated by Democrat Cindy Axne of nearby West Des Moines. Axne won 49% of the vote to Young's 47.5%, with four different third-party candidates winning the remaining 3.5% of the vote. He won 15 of the district's 16 counties, but could not overcome a deficit of over 30,000 votes in the district's most populous county of Polk.

2020 

Young was the Republican nominee in the 2020 election to represent Iowa's 3rd congressional district in the U.S. House. He challenged incumbent Democrat Cindy Axne, who defeated Young in the 2018 election. However, he was again unsuccessful.

Tenure
Young was sworn into office on January 3, 2015.

He was a member of the Republican Main Street Partnership and the Veterinary Medicine Caucus.

In April 2015, Young joined the Southwest Iowa Housing Trust Fund to announce over $530,000 in affordable housing grants from the Federal Home Loan Bank of Des Moines (FHLB Des Moines) Strong Communities Fund. The grants would assist nearly 100 residents with key home repairs.

During the January 2018 government shutdown, Young remained in Washington, canceled town hall meetings, and, in solidarity with government employees who were going unpaid during the shutdown, refused to accept his own salary. “I'm disappointed and I can't believe that Congress is getting paid during this time right now,” he said. “The people working hard every day in the military, for our federal government, should not be blamed for this.”

Committee assignments
 Committee on Appropriations
 Subcommittee on Agriculture, Rural Development, Food and Drug Administration, and Related Agencies
 Subcommittee on Homeland Security
 Subcommittee on Transportation, Housing and Urban Development, and Related Agencies

Later political career
In February 2022, Young stated that he was contesting the 28th district seat in the Iowa House of Representatives.

Political positions

LGBT issues
In May 2016, he voted to approve a measure aimed at upholding an executive order that bars discrimination against LGBT employees by federal contractors.

Veterans

In 2016, Young sponsored the "No Veterans Crisis Line Call Should Go Unanswered Act" aimed at reducing suicides of veterans. The bill passed the U.S. House unanimously.

Health care
Young voted to repeal the Affordable Care Act (Obamacare) in 2015.

Young opposed the original March 2017 Republican effort to repeal Obamacare. When the effort ended in March 2017 with the withdrawal of the GOP health-care legislation from further consideration, Young praised Trump and the party leaders for this action and called for everyone to join anew in “a thoughtful and deliberate process that takes the time and input to get this right to achieve accessible, affordable quality healthcare for every American.”

Young supported the second 2017 Republican effort to repeal Obamacare. On May 4, 2017, Young voted to repeal the Affordable Care Act. This second repeal effort narrowly passed the House 217-213, but failed in the Senate. The repeal bill that Young voted for would have made it possible for states to allow insurers to raise health care premiums for individuals with preexisting conditions who did not have continuous coverage. At the same time as he sought to repeal the Affordable Care Act, Young pushed for an amendment intended to assist those with preexisting conditions who saw their premiums rise; many health policy analysts have questioned whether it would have succeeded in doing so.

In September 2017, Young supported the refunding of the Children's Health Insurance Program.

Tax reform
Young supports tax reform and voted in favor of the Tax Cuts and Jobs Act of 2017. He said he believed the bill would provide tax relief to Iowans.

In April 2018, he voted for a Balanced Budget Amendment. In June 2018, Young voted for H.R. 3, the Spending Cuts to Expired and Unnecessary Programs Act, also known as the rescission package.

Tariffs
In September 2017, Young was part of a six-member bipartisan delegation that traveled to China to discuss agriculture, North Korea, the South China Sea, energy, and cybersecurity with Chinese officials. “The continued potential for growth in exports to China for Iowa’s products is of great importance to job and economic growth for the state,” said Young. In April 2018, Young told an interviewer that while he agreed with President Trump's belief in the need for “regulatory relief and common-sense regulatory reform and tax relief,” he and many of his constituents believe that “tariffs are taxes,” and are therefore “going to hurt consumers, going to hurt employers.”

Immigration
In January 2018, Young reiterated support for permanent legal status for so-called DREAMers, saying that he would vote for a measure giving them residency while also improving border security. “I want to find a way for those people to be here legally and stay here without fear of deportation,” Young said, but added that he was “not quite there on citizenship” for immigrants covered by DACA. He acknowledged that might support a citizenship guarantee if it was tied to enhanced border security or immigration controls.

Foreign policy

Young supported the 2017 Shayrat missile strike.

Israel
Young, a strong supporter of Israel, visited that country in August 2017 to meet with Israeli and Palestinian leaders and to tour the nation. Young stated: “I look forward to further understanding the unique challenges the people of Israel, and the entire region, face as we work to pursue and achieve policies which will provide security and stability in a region where we have long prayed for peace.”

Abortion
Young opposes using federal funds to pay for abortions. He does not believe Planned Parenthood should receive federal funding. He does "believes in women’s access to healthcare and contraceptives" with the organization relying on outside funding to achieve these ends.

Drug policy

In 2016, Young co-sponsored the Compassionate Access, Research Expansion, and Respect States Act (CARERS Act). The CARERS Act is a marijuana policy reform which would reschedule cannabis to allow it to be researched and would permit states with medical marijuana programs to operate without federal interference.

Electoral history

2014

2016

2018

2020

Personal life
Young is a non-denominational Christian and lives in Van Meter.

References

External links
 Campaign website
 
 
 

1968 births
21st-century American politicians
Drake University alumni
Living people
People from Van Meter, Iowa
Political chiefs of staff
Republican Party members of the Iowa House of Representatives
Republican Party members of the United States House of Representatives from Iowa
United States congressional aides